Ciasne  is a village in the administrative district of Gmina Supraśl, within Białystok County, Podlaskie Voivodeship, in north-eastern Poland.

The village has an approximate population of 300.

References

Ciasne